Steve Tappin (born 5 September 1966) is a global leadership coach to CEOs, entrepreneurs, political figures and cultural icons. He is the co-founder and CEO of Beyond Unity and co-author of The Awareness Code and The Secrets of CEOs. He also hosted the BBC World television series CEO Guru. His goal is to help create an incredible world through transforming leadership.

Early life
Steve Elliott Tappin was born 5 September 1966 in Harrogate, North Yorkshire in England Tappin was the eldest of three children to David and Sylvia Tappin, his mother being "the heart of the family". Tappin says he was heavily inspired by his father, who he considered a maverick entrepreneur.
Tappin went to school at Harrogate Grammar School, which was traditionally focused on rugby, however Tappin's passion was football. In his teenage years, he played representative football for both York City and Bradford City.

Career 
Tappin began his career with the chemical company ICI, on a management training scheme, where he studied for accountancy qualifications (FCCA). After he left, Tappin was mentored by Sir John Harvey-Jones, who as chairman, made major changes to ICI's business.[1]
In his late 20s and early 30s, he worked for KPMG, PA Consulting and Heidrick and Struggles. It was here he noticed these global professional services firms faced similar challenges to the major corporations they advised. This motivated Tappin to devoted his life to coaching CEOs on how to transform their leadership.
In 2000, Tappin created and co-owned a global growth and corporate venturing consulting firm, Edengene, which helped British Telecom set up new BT Broadband services. Under Tappin's leadership, Edengene was awarded "Best Small Business" and "Gold Medal Award for Client Work" from the Management Consultancies Association.
In 2005, Tappin established a consulting firm, Leaders Reloaded, to pilot a new coaching service for CEOs.

Beyond Unity 
Since 2008, Tappin has been the founder and CEO of Xinfu - an award-winning global CEO and leadership consulting firm. Xinfu has worked with companies such as Reckitt, Newcrest Mining, Virgin Group, LinkedIn, Telstra, easyJet and Informa. Using the Four Quadrant approach, consultants work in both a 1:1 capacity and with teams to raise self-awareness, define a North Star, create authentic fellowships and assist companies to deliver outperformance.

"Through Xinfu, we are paving the way for large companies to be transformed who we think will have the most impact to change the world."[4]

Tappin has been invited to be a keynote speaker at prestigious global forums, such as the World Retail Congress, SuperReturns, HRTech and Leaders in London/India. He has shared the stage with many entrepreneurs like Richard Branson where he has spoken on the current state of leadership, as well as shared his work on ‘CEO Types’.

As of April, 2022, Xinfu changed its name to Beyond Unity. The reason for the change was due to the company seeking to have a name that reflected its global reach and its role in unifying the world. A core theme of Beyond Unity is about bringing together and unifying leaders and teams, and working to take them even further to outperformance, go off the charts and achievements they felt were unimaginable.

The Awareness Code 
In 2021, Tappin co-authored with Wayne Linton the book The Awareness Code: the secrets to emotional power and incredible leadership. The book was released by Bloomsbury on 28 October 2021.[3]
'The Awareness Code' features a map of the human experience that breaks it down into 10 unique level of consciousness, with each level being made up of 10 'tiles' that further articulate the level. There are six levels that make up 'lower awareness' (60 tiles - also representing the ego) and four levels that constitute 'higher awareness' (40 tiles - becoming a higher awareness leader). There is also a level called 'Beyond Incredible' above the primary 10 levels that features tiles such as 'Doing the impossible', 'Mastery' and 'Profound'.
The book also features the '24 Keys' that are tools to assist the reader in lifting their own awareness from lower to higher awareness, as well as different levels of mind (Thinking, Witness, Wisdom and Unity mind) and a tool on balancing productivity and rest (RUDE and RAW).
The Awareness Code received over 50 testimonials from corporate leaders, entrepreneurs, sporting icons and cultural figures, including:
 Dame Sharon White, Chairman of the John Lewis Partnership and Second Permanent Secretary at HM Treasury
 Margo Georgiadis, Former President and CEO, Ancestry
 Paul Drechsler CBE, Chairman of International Chamber of Commerce and former president of the Confederation of British Industry.
 Angus Kinnear, CEO, Leeds United F.C.
 Julia Ingall, Chief People Officer, ManyPets
 Kevin Sinfield OBE, Defensive Coach for Leicester Tigers, Former Captain and Director of Rugby for Leeds Rhinos
 Andy Penn, CEO, Telstra, Fortune 500 Company
 Michael Vaughan OBE, former England cricket Captain and Commentator
 Joe Baolin Zhou, Co-Founder, CEO & CEdO at (Shenzhen) Singularity Education and leader responsible for setting up Harvard in China
 Ian McGarrigle, Chairman, World Retail Congress
 Stephen Murphy, Former Group Chief Executive, Virgin Group
 Justin Langer, former Head Coach and player, Australian men’s cricket team
 Harriet Green, Previous CEO & Chair of IBM Asia Pacific
 Dr Frank-Jürgen Richter, Founder and Chairman Horasis: The Global Visions Community
 Steve McClaren, Former England Manager & Senior FIFA consultant
Tappin and Linton have also created an ‘Awareness Code’ application for both iOS and Android. The app features over 200 videos that further explore the tiles, as well as guided meditations for each tile in higher awareness. There is also a feature that allows users to give others feedback based on their higher and lower tiles.

The Beyond Incredible Group 
In 2021, Linton and Tappin created the ‘Beyond Incredible Group’. ‘BIG’, as it became known, is a leadership program and global network of some of the most powerful and influential leaders.

The current BIG members include:
 Award-winning and top CEOs
 Global entrepreneurs
 Future political leaders
 Private equity owners
 Top female leaders
 Medical practitioners

The purpose of BIG is to assist leaders to reach their highest level of human awareness and to identify their ‘Highest Callings’ in life, and then to work in connection with other BIG members to support each other to accomplish their goals. Each year, the BIG members meet at a retreat to further develop and strengthen their network. The program also features 1:1 sessions, groups sessions and the learning of unique mastery meditation techniques.

The criteria for a person to be considered for BIG follows the ‘Four Is’:
 Incredible: show glimpses of the level of ‘Incredible’, described in detail in The Awareness Code.
 Integrity: they need to be an individual that conducts themselves with a strong sense of integrity.
 Inspiring: have the ability to inspire others.
 Influential: they must already be in some position of leadership or influence or seen to have the potential to do so.

The Secrets of CEOs 
In 2008, Tappin co-wrote The Secrets of CEOs – 150 leaders on business, life and leadership with Andy Cave. 
The updated edition includes interviews with 200 CEOs including: John Browne, Baron Browne of Madingley, Ben Verwaayen, Michael Dell, Narayana Murthy, Liu Jiren, and Carolyn McCall. Richard Branson wrote the foreword for the book.[6]
The book explores leadership best practice in the corporate world and explores the Five Transformational Changes in the world:
 Hard globalisation
 Decoding sustainability
 The third wave of the web
 Riding cycles of capitalism
 The first world war for talent

The book also features Tappin’s theory of ‘CEO Types’ - a classification of CEOs into the following leadership styles:

 The Commercial Executor
 The Corporate Entrepreneur
 The Financial Value Driver
 The Corporate Ambassador
 The Global Missionary
 The People’s Champion
 The Professional Manager

Finally, the book brings to life the CEO health warning and helps leaders find balance in their personal life, and discusses preparing the next generation for leadership.

BBC's CEO Guru 
The series featured Tappin hosting interviews with CEOs, sharing CEO best practices and the latest advancements on the global CEO agenda. It ran for eight seasons.
The format consists of several short films, plus associated web articles for BBC World News TV, BBC.COM, BBC Capital and BBC News online.
Previous interviewees include: Richard Branson, Meg Whitman (Hewlett-Packard), Jeff Immelt (GE), Liu Chuanzhi (Lenovo), Ryan Holmes (Hootsuite), Helena Morrissey (Newton Investment Management) Sir Martin Sorrell (WPP), Walter Robb and John Mackay (Whole Foods), Guo Guancgchang (Fosun), Jayne Hrdlicka (A2 Milk), Wang Shi (Vanke), and Paul Walsh (Diageo).[5]
Several episodes have featured specific CEOs and their organisations including WholeFoods (USA) and Fosun (China).

Leading in China and the CEC 
Tappin spent many years visiting Chinese entrepreneurs and building relationships in a notoriously difficult forum for Westerners to break into. Eventually he managed to build a strong connection with the Chinese Entrepreneur Club (CEC) and had the privilege of presenting to its members many times at the Global Forum and the Sustainability Forum. He went on to work with them in partnership to write a leadership book called Secrets of Chinese CEOs (Dream to Last is the Mandarin book title).

Through the CEC, Tappin managed to gain access to over a hundred of China's top business leaders.

The book was published by the Beijing University Press in 2015 with featured interviewees such as:

 Liu Chuanzhi, Founder, Lenovo 
 Guo Guangchang, Founder, Fosun Group
 Li Shufu, Founder, Geely Holding Group
 Wang Shi, Founder and Chairman, Vanke
 Charles Chao, Chairman & CEO, SINA
 Li Dongsheng, Founder, TCL Group
 Wang Chuanfu, Founder, BYD
 Huang Nubo, Founder, Zhongkun Group

The book’s foreword was written by Sir Martin Sorrell, founder and CEO of WPP.

Awards 
 'Best Leadership of a Mould-Breaking Firm globally across the professional services industry’ at the MPF Awards for Management of Excellence 2018
 ‘Best Global Leadership Coaching and Consultancy Company’ - Global Brands Magazine 2021

Philanthropy 
Tappin contributes to Wellness Gateway Australia by supporting subsidised sessions in Soul-Focused Psychotherapy and has donated 100% of the proceeds of The Secrets of CEOs towards cancer research.

References

External links 
 Xinfu

British chief executives
American chief executives
1966 births
Living people